The Source  is an album by drummer Tony Allen recorded in 2017 and released on the Blue Note label.

Reception

Response was positive, with Metacritic assigning the album an aggregate score of 83 out of 100 based on 9 critical reviews indicating "Universal acclaim". The AllMusic review by Matt Collar called it "an earthy, majestic, endlessly inventive album that caps both his own storied career and points the way toward the future" observing that "On The Source, he balances both his jazz and Afrobeat sides, delivering buoyant songs that are equal parts funky jams, harmonic engagements, and modal workouts". On  All About Jazz, Mark Sullivan noted "African and French musicians playing American jazz, recorded on analog tape: this is fusion of a special kind". In The Guardian, John Lewis said "The Source builds on Allen’s recent mini-LP of Art Blakey covers, but this time he and musical director Yann Jankielewicz invoke other jazz legends". Pitchfork's, Ben Cardew stated "On this hybrid album of jazz and Afrobeat, long-time Fela Kuti drummer Tony Allen makes the complex sound effortless. Rarely has percussive innovation sounded this downright satisfying".

Track listing 
All compositions by Tony Allen and Yann Jankielewicz except where noted
 "Moody Boy" – 6:33
 "Bad Roads" – 5:48
 "Cruising" – 6:01
 "On Fire" (Allen, Jankielewicz, Jean Phillippe Dury) – 6:17
 "Woro Dance" – 6:39
 "Tony's Blues" – 5:00
 "Wolf Eats Wolf" – 5:37
 "Cool Cats" – 4:22
 "Push and Pull" (Allen, Jankielewicz, Indy Dibongue) – 5:56
 "Ewajo" – 5:34
 "Life Is Beautiful" – 6:26

Personnel 
Tony Allen – drums
Nicolas Giraud – trumpet, flugelhorn
Daniel Zimmermann – trombone, tuba
Yann Jankielewicz – alto saxophone, tenor saxophone, baritone saxophone
Jean-Jacques Elangué – tenor saxophone, soprano saxophone 
Remi Sciuto – flute, baritone saxophone, bass saxophone
Jean Phi Dary – grand piano, organ, clavinet
Indy Dibongue – guitar
Mathias Allamane – double bass
Vincent Taurelle – organ (track 11)
Damon Albarn – piano (track 8)

References 

Tony Allen (musician) albums
2017 albums
Blue Note Records albums